DL class can refer to:
 Australian National DL class, diesel locomotive
 New Zealand DL class locomotive, diesel locomotive